The 2005–06 Süper Lig season began with Turkcell signing a 5-year sponsorship deal with the Turkish Football Federation to name the league Turkcell Süper Lig.

Since Turkey dropped from tenth to eleventh place in the UEFA association coefficient rankings at the end of the 2004–05 season,  the champions will not directly be entered into the group stage of the UEFA Champions League any more, but rather have to begin in the third qualification round.

The season also saw a first in Turkish football; for the first time in history the team that entered the last week first, Fenerbahçe, failed to win the title. Fenerbahçe and Galatasaray went into the last week deadlocked at 80 points and Fenerbahçe had a better head-to-head record. Fenerbahçe needed only a win to defend their title and win their third successive championship. However, a 1–1 draw to Denizlispor combined with a 3–0 Galatasaray win against Kayserispor gave Galatasaray their 16th league title. The same day, Gaziantepspor defeated Malatyaspor 1–0 and remained in the Süper Lig. Ankaraspor, with a 1–0 win away to Erciyesspor, managed to remain, but Malatyaspor, Samsunspor and Diyarbakırspor were relegated to TFF First League.

Final league table

Results

Statistics

Top scorers
 Last updated on May 23, 2008

Hat-tricks

References

Süper Lig seasons
Turkey
1